Tesni Evans (born 15 October 1992 in Cardiff) is a professional squash player who represents Wales and is a five time Welsh national squash champion. She reached a career-high world ranking of World No.9 in November 2018, becoming the highest-ranked Welsh woman of all-time and the first to break into the Top 10. Evans has represented Team Wales in the 2014 Commonwealth Games, the 2018 Commonwealth Games and in the WSF World Team Championships.

The 25-year-old, born in Cardiff but living in Rhyl, became the first Welsh player to land the prestigious British National Championship, when in 2018, she beat Alison Waters 11–5, 11–9, 11–7 in the final in Manchester. Evans is the first Welsh player to lift the title (male or female). Evans retained the British National title, becoming a two-time champion, the following year in 2019, when she defeated England's Emily Whitlock 3-0 (11-3, 11–6, 11–5) in the final, which was contested in Nottingham.

Tesni Evans competed at the 2018 Commonwealth Games which was also her second consecutive Commonwealth Games appearance and claimed her maiden Commonwealth Games medal after stunning defending Commonwealth Games champion Nicol David of Malaysia in the bronze medal match of the women's singles event. This medal was also the first Commonwealth Games medal earned by Wales in squash events after 20 years since the 1998 Commonwealth Games.

References

External links 

1992 births
Living people
Welsh female squash players
Commonwealth Games bronze medallists for Wales
Commonwealth Games medallists in squash
Squash players at the 2014 Commonwealth Games
Squash players at the 2018 Commonwealth Games
Medallists at the 2018 Commonwealth Games